Ho Lye Toh (born 1923) is a Singaporean retired weightlifter and a three times former Miss Singapore.

Toh's father was Ho Peng Khoen, a school teacher and Malayan weightlifting champion. He encouraged Ho to weightlift in order to build up her strength, rewarding her with small gifts as she lifted greater weights. Eventually she mastered the snatch-lift. 

Ho also entered beauty pageants winning several times but was forced to stop following the Japanese invasion of Singapore during World War II. She tried again after the war but her boyfriend asked her to stop as she was too successful.

Personal life 
Ho married a photographer at age 28 and give birth to her first child at 29. Her husband died at age 59.

References

External links 
"MISS SINGAPORE" FOR 2ND TIME

Singaporean female weightlifters
Singaporean beauty pageant winners
Living people
1923 births